Parmularius is a genus of large extinct African alcelaphines from the Pliocene and Pleistocene. It is a close relative of topi and hartebeest. One species is noticeable by its long, weakly curved horns.

References

Alcelaphinae
Prehistoric bovids
Pliocene even-toed ungulates
Pleistocene even-toed ungulates
Pleistocene genus extinctions
Pliocene mammals of Africa
Pleistocene mammals of Africa
Prehistoric even-toed ungulate genera